Equality may refer to:

Society
 Egalitarianism,  a trend of thought that favors equality for all people
 Political egalitarianism, in which all members of a society are of equal standing
 Equal opportunity, a stipulation that all people should be treated similarly
 Equality of outcome, in which the general conditions of people's lives are similar
 For specific groups:
 Gender equality
 Racial equality
 Social equality, in which all people within a group have the same status
 Economic inequality
 Equality Party (disambiguation), several political parties
 Consociationalism, in which an ethnically, religiously, or linguistically divided state functions by cooperation of each group's elites

Law
 Equality before the law, the principle under which all people are subject to the same laws
 Equality Act (disambiguation), several pieces of legislation

Mathematics and logic
 Equality (mathematics), the relationship between expressions that represent the same value or mathematical object
 Equals sign, =
 Logical equality

Places 
 Equality, Alabama, an unincorporated community
 Equality Township, Gallatin County, Illinois
 Equality, Illinois, a village
 Equality Township, Red Lake County, Minnesota
 Equality Colony, an American socialist colony founded in 1897 in Washington state

Arts and entertainment
 Equality (film), a 2010 American documentary short film by Al Sutton
 Equality (novel), an 1897 utopian novel by Edward Bellamy
 Equality; or, A History of Lithconia, an 1837 utopian fantasy novel by an anonymous author

See also

 Equal (disambiguation)
 Inequality (disambiguation)
 Equity (disambiguation)
 Liberté, égalité, fraternité (liberty, equality, fraternity), motto of the French Revolution